The Electronic Entertainment Expo 2014 (E3 2014) was the 20th E3 held. The event took place at the Los Angeles Convention Center in Los Angeles, California. It began on June 10, 2014, and ended on June 12, 2014, with 48,900 total attendees.

Major exhibitors included Microsoft Corporation, Nintendo, and Sony Computer Entertainment. Exhibitors host their own press conferences usually one day prior to the E3 event, but some companies issued additional information an extra day prior this time.

Press conferences

Microsoft
Microsoft hosted a press conference on June 9 at 9:30 am.
Trailers for Forza Horizon 2, Rise of the Tomb Raider, Evolve, Dragon Age: Inquisition, Sunset Overdrive, Project Spark, Ori and the Blind Forest, Halo 5: Guardians, Scalebound, a new character for Killer Instinct: Season 2, a Phantom Dust reboot and Crackdown 3 were revealed.
There was also gameplay footage of Assassin's Creed Unity, Call of Duty Advanced Warfare, Sunset Overdrive, The Witcher 3: Wild Hunt and Tom Clancy's The Division. Halo: The Master Chief Collection, Scalebound and Dance Central Spotlight were announced as well.

Electronic Arts
Electronic Arts hosted a press conference on June 9 at 12:00 pm. Among the new titles shown were the role-playing game Dragon Age: Inquisition and Mass Effect 4, the action-adventure title Mirror's Edge: Catalyst and Star Wars: Battlefront, the first-person shooter Battlefield Hardline and the life simulation game The Sims 4. EA Sports announced a number of new releases, such as Madden NFL 15, NBA Live 15, FIFA 15, NHL 15 and EA Sports PGA Tour. Two untitled projects from Criterion Games and BioWare were also announced.

Ubisoft
Ubisoft hosted a press conference on June 9 at 3:00 pm. Upcoming action-adventure games included Tom Clancy's The Division, The Crew, Valiant Hearts: The Great War and the sequels Assassin's Creed Unity and Far Cry 4. Tom Clancy's Rainbow Six: Siege and Just Dance 2015 were also announced during the conference.

Sony
Sony hosted a press conference on June 9 at 6:00 pm. The new CEO of SCEA was officially introduced as Shawn Layden. An all new white version of the PlayStation 4 was shown bundled with Destiny to be released at launch of the game. Announcement trailers were shown for PlayStation exclusives Bloodborne by FromSoftware, LittleBigPlanet 3 by Sumo Digital, and Uncharted 4: A Thief's End by Naughty Dog, among others. Trailers were also shown for Grand Theft Auto V, Dead Island 2, No Man's Sky, Destiny, Mortal Kombat X, Far Cry 4, Batman: Arkham Knight, Metal Gear Solid V: The Phantom Pain and others. Sony also announced an original TV series to be produced based on Powers.

Nintendo
Nintendo for a second consecutive E3 decided to forego hosting a traditional press conference in favor of a pre-recorded video presentation, billed the Nintendo Digital Event, which streamed online on June 10 at 9:00 am with an accompanying press release. Anchored by Nintendo of America COO Reggie Fils-Aimé and featuring stop motion sketches from the producers of Robot Chicken, the Digital Event primarily followed a documentary format with game footage and trailers accompanied by short interviews with developers. During this event, Nintendo showcased upcoming titles including Super Smash Bros. for Nintendo 3DS and Wii U, Yoshi's Woolly World, Bayonetta 2 from PlatinumGames, Koei Tecmo's Zelda spin-off Hyrule Warriors, and Xenoblade Chronicles X by Monolith Soft, among others. First time reveals included the next Legend of Zelda for Wii U, Mario Maker, Captain Toad: Treasure Tracker, Kirby and the Rainbow Curse, multiplayer shooter Splatoon and an early look at the newest Star Fox title for Wii U. The Digital Event also featured the debut of Nintendo's NFC platform, revealed as Amiibo.

List of notable exhibitors
This is a list of major video game exhibitors who made appearances at E3 2014.

 2K
 505
 Activision Blizzard
 Atlus
 Aksys Games
 Bandai Namco
 Bethesda
 Capcom
 CD Projekt Red
 Crytek
 Deep Silver
 Devolver Digital
 Disney
 Electronic Arts
 Epic
 Konami
 Microsoft
 Natsume
 Nintendo
 NIS
 Rockstar Games
 Sega
 Sony
 Square Enix
 Tecmo Koei
 Telltale
 Ubisoft
 Warner Bros.
 Xseed Games
 Zynga

List of featured games
This is a list of notable titles that appeared at E3 2014.

References

2014 in Los Angeles
2014 in video gaming
2014
June 2014 events in the United States